The 2016 Mutua Madrid Open was a professional tennis tournament played on outdoor clay courts at the Park Manzanares in Madrid, Spain from 30 April to 8 May 2016. It was the 15th edition of the event on the ATP World Tour and 8th on the WTA Tour. It was classified as an ATP World Tour Masters 1000 event on the 2016 ATP World Tour and a Premier Mandatory event on the 2016 WTA Tour.

On 1 May, tournament organizers staged a successful Guinness World Record. 1,474 people—including spectators, players, and tournament officials—bounced tennis balls on racquets simultaneously for ten seconds. This broke the previous record of 767 people set at the 2015 China Open.

Ion Țiriac the former Romanian ATP player and now billionaire businessman is the current owner of the tournament.

Points and prize money

Point distribution

Prize money

ATP singles main-draw entrants

Seeds

Rankings are as of 25 April 2016.

Other entrants
The following players received wildcards into the main draw:
  Nicolás Almagro
  Pablo Carreño Busta
  Juan Mónaco
  Fernando Verdasco

The following player received entry using a protected ranking into the main draw:
  Juan Martín del Potro

The following players received entry from the qualifying draw:
  Roberto Carballés Baena
  Santiago Giraldo
  Pierre-Hugues Herbert
  Denis Istomin
  Denis Kudla
  Lucas Pouille
  Radek Štěpánek

The following player received entry as a lucky loser:
  Marcel Granollers

Withdrawals
Before the tournament
  Marin Čilić → replaced by  Vasek Pospisil 
  Tommy Haas → replaced by  Borna Ćorić
  John Isner → replaced by  Teymuraz Gabashvili
  Martin Kližan → replaced by Albert Ramos Viñolas
  Andreas Seppi → replaced by  Andrey Kuznetsov
  Roger Federer (late withdrawal) → replaced by  Marcel Granollers

ATP doubles main-draw entrants

Seeds

Rankings are as of 25 April 2016.

Other entrants
The following pairs received wildcards into the doubles main draw:
  Mahesh Bhupathi /  Fabrice Martin
  Pablo Carreño Busta /  Fernando Verdasco

WTA singles main-draw entrants

Seeds

Rankings are as of 25 April 2016.

Other entrants
The following players received wildcards into the main draw:
  Lara Arruabarrena
  Paula Badosa Gibert
  Sorana Cîrstea
  Lourdes Domínguez Lino
  Sara Sorribes Tormo

The following players received entry using a protected ranking into the main draw:
  Karin Knapp
  Laura Robson

The following players received entry from the qualifying draw:
  Louisa Chirico
  Mirjana Lučić-Baroni
  Monica Puig
  Alison Riske
  Laura Siegemund
  Kateřina Siniaková
  Patricia Maria Țig
  Elena Vesnina

The following player received entry as a lucky loser:
  Heather Watson

Withdrawals
Before the tournament
  Belinda Bencic (lower back injury) → replaced by  Heather Watson
  Flavia Pennetta (retirement from tennis) → replaced by  Danka Kovinić
  Maria Sharapova (provisional suspension) → replaced by  Anna-Lena Friedsam
  Serena Williams (flu) → replaced by  Laura Robson
  Venus Williams (hamstring injury) → replaced by  Christina McHale
  Caroline Wozniacki (right ankle injury) → replaced by  Dominika Cibulková

During the tournament
  Victoria Azarenka (back injury)
  Camila Giorgi (mid-back injury)
  Lucie Šafářová (gastrointestinal illness)

Retirements
  Paula Badosa Gibert (cramping)
  Johanna Konta (upper respiratory illness)

WTA doubles main-draw entrants

Seeds

Rankings are as of 25 April 2016.

Other entrants
The following pairs received wildcards into the doubles main draw:
  Paula Badosa Gibert /  María José Martínez Sánchez
  Svetlana Kuznetsova /  Anastasia Pavlyuchenkova
  Květa Peschke /  Barbora Strýcová
  Sílvia Soler Espinosa /  Sara Sorribes Tormo

The following pair received entry as alternates:
  Raluca Olaru /  Alicja Rosolska

Withdrawals
Before the tournament
  Lucie Šafářová (gastrointestinal illness)

During the tournament
  Anastasia Pavlyuchenkova (left adductor injury)
  Carla Suárez Navarro (upper respiratory illness)

Retirements
  Laura Siegemund (dizziness)

Champions

Men's singles
 
  Novak Djokovic def.  Andy Murray, 6–2, 3–6, 6–3

Women's singles
 
  Simona Halep def.  Dominika Cibulková, 6–2, 6–4

Men's doubles
 
  Jean-Julien Rojer /  Horia Tecău def.  Rohan Bopanna /  Florin Mergea, 6–4, 7–6(7–5)

Women's doubles
 
   Caroline Garcia /  Kristina Mladenovic def.  Martina Hingis /  Sania Mirza, 6–4, 6–4

References

External links
 Official website